Mercer is the given name of:

 Mercer Barrows, American television producer, art director and writer
 Mercer Ellington (1919–1996), American jazz trumpeter, composer and arranger
 Mercer Mayer (born 1943), American children's book writer and illustrator
 Mercer Reynolds (born 1945), American businessman 
 Mercer Simpson (1926–2007), English writer active in Welsh literary circles

See also
 Will Mercer Cook (1903–1987), African-American diplomat and professor